King Xuan of Qi (died 301 BC) was from 319 to 301 BC ruler of Qi, one of the seven major states of the Warring States period of ancient China.  King Xuan's personal name was Tian Bijiang (田辟疆), ancestral name Gui (媯), and King Xuan was his posthumous title.

King Xuan succeeded his father King Wei of Qi, who died in 320 BC after 37 years of reign.  He reigned for 19 years and died in 301 BC.  He was succeeded by his son, King Min of Qi.

In traditional Chinese historiography, king Xuan is best known for receiving advice of Mencius. He is generally credited with the establishment of the Jixia Academy.

Family
Queens:
 Queen Xuan (d. 312 BC)
 Lady, of the Zhongli lineage of Qi, personal name Chun

Concubines:
 Lady, of the Xia clan of Qi, personal name Yingchun

Sons:
 Prince Di (323–284 BC), ruled as King Min of Qi from 300–284 BC
 Youngest son, Prince Tong, the progenitor of the Yan lineage
 Granted the fiefdom of Lu

Ancestry

References

Monarchs of Qi (state)
4th-century BC Chinese monarchs
Chinese kings
301 BC deaths
Year of birth unknown